Sekkemo ( or Säkkimukka) is a village in Kvænangen Municipality in Troms og Finnmark county, Norway. European route E6 runs through the village. Sekkemo Church is located here.

References

Villages in Troms
Kvænangen